Gakologelwang Lesiba Masheto (born 1 November 1984 in Maun) is a Botswana sprinter, who specialized in the 400 metres. He set a personal best time of 45.41 seconds by winning the 400 metres at a collegiate athletics meet in Tucson, Arizona.

Masheto represented Botswana at the 2008 Summer Olympics in Beijing, where he competed for the men's 400 metres. He ran in the first heat against seven other athletes, including Belgium's Kévin Borlée, and United States' David Neville, both of whom were heavy favorites in this event. He finished the race in last place by twenty-three hundredths of a second (0.23) behind Mauritius' Eric Milazar, with a seasonal best time of 46.29 seconds. Masheto, however, failed to advance into the semi-finals, as he placed thirty-eighth overall, and was ranked farther below three mandatory slots for the next round.

Masheto is also a member of the track and field team for the Illinois Fighting Illini, and a graduate of kinesiology at the University of Illinois in Urbana, Illinois.

References

External links
 
Profile – Illinois Fighting Illini
NBC Olympics Profile

1984 births
Living people
People from North-West District (Botswana)
Botswana male sprinters
Olympic athletes of Botswana
Athletes (track and field) at the 2008 Summer Olympics
Commonwealth Games competitors for Botswana
Athletes (track and field) at the 2006 Commonwealth Games
Athletes (track and field) at the 2010 Commonwealth Games
Illinois Fighting Illini men's track and field athletes